Kiar-e Sharqi Rural District is in the Central District of Kiar County, Chaharmahal and Bakhtiari province, Iran. At the census of 2006, its population was 8,540 in 2,041 households, when it was in Shahrekord County, and before the establishment of Kiar County. There were 8,356 inhabitants in 2,353 households at the following census of 2011, by which time Kiar County had been formed. At the most recent census of 2016, the population of the rural district was 7,699 in 2,335 households. The largest of its five villages was Dezak, with 2,942 people.

References 

Kiar County

Rural Districts of Chaharmahal and Bakhtiari Province

Populated places in Chaharmahal and Bakhtiari Province

Populated places in Kiar County